Costa Diadema is a  owned by Carnival Corporation and operated by Costa Crociere. The ship was ordered in October 2012 and was delivered to Costa on 25 October 2014. At her time of delivery, Costa Diadema was the largest vessel to fly an Italian flag and Costa's largest vessel to date; she is currently Costa Crociere's flagship.

Design and engineering

Costa Diademas 11 kV electrical generation system is provided from six generators, six aft/bow thruster electrical motors, HV main switchboard and distribution transformers, propulsion transformers, synchro drives, and motors from General Electric.

The ship includes three swimming pools, three dining areas, a 4D cinema hall, and a Saṃsāra spa across four decks.

Construction and career 
Costa Cruises ordered the Dream-class vessel in October 2012, making her the largest ship to be ordered and built for Costa. The ship cost Carnival Corporation US$739 million to build. She was ordered and built to replace , which sank earlier in the year.

Costa Diadema had her keel laid on 10 December 2012 at Fincantieri's shipyard in Marghera, marking the beginning of her hull assembly. She was launched on 15 November 2013, with an official ceremony performed by Franca Grasso, the ship's madrina at her launch. She was delivered on 25 October 2014 and performed a "Vernissage Cruise," from Trieste to Genoa on 1 November. Her naming ceremony was held on 7 November 2014 at the Port of Genoa, where she was officially christened by Italian travel agent, Carolina Micelli.

Costa Diadema spent her inaugural season and subsequent seasons cruising the Western Mediterranean until she was redeployed to Dubai in November 2018 to begin cruising the Persian Gulf for the winter season. As of 2019, she rotated between the Mediterranean in the spring and summer months and the Persian Gulf in the fall and winter months.

On 24 March 2020, the ship docked at Limassol, Cyprus, and a crew member suspected of suffering from the coronavirus was taken to hospital. Several other crew members were also reported to be ill. Costa Diadema was sailing from Dubai to Savona, Italy, without passengers.

References

External links

 Official site

Ships built in Venice
2013 ships
Cruise ships of Italy
Ships built by Fincantieri
Ships of Costa Cruises